The 2016–17 season (officially known as Liga de Plata and also as Torneo Luis Baltazar Ramírez) will be El Salvador's Segunda División de Fútbol Salvadoreño The season will be split into two championships Apertura 2016 and Clausura 2017. The champions of the Apertura and Clausura play the direct promotion playoff every year. The winner of that series ascends to Primera División de Fútbol de El Salvador.

Changes from the 2016-2017 seasons
Teams promoted to 2016–17 Primera División de Fútbol Profesional season
 C.D. Municipal Limeño

Teams relegated to Segunda División de Fútbol Salvadoreño  - Apertura 2016
 Atletico Marte

Teams relegated to Tercera División de Fútbol Profesional - Apertura 2016 
 Ciclón del Golfo

Teams promoted from Tercera Division De Fútbol Profesional - Apertura 2016
 Turin FESA
 Jocoro F.C.
 Rácing Jr

New Teams or teams that purchased a spot in the Segunda division
 Brujos de Izalco  (Quequeisque changed their name and location to Brujos de Izalco)
 EF San Pablo Tacachico (originally de-registered but bought the spot of Toros FC)

Teams that failed to register for the Apertura 2016
 EF San Pablo Tacachico (Team de-registered due to breaking player rules)
 C.D. Brasilia (Team de-registered due to not paying their debts)
 C.D. UDET (they were given a spot from Brasilia who had failed to pay their debts, however since they had formally joined terceea division they were not allowed)
 Toros (sold their spot to San Pablo)

Team information
A total of 23 teams will contest the league, including  sides from the 2015–16 Segunda División and 3 promoted from the Tercera Division.

Teams

Managerial changes

Apertura 2016

Group A

Results

Group B

Results

Group C

Results

Final Series

Finals

First leg

Second leg

Independiente won 3-1 on aggregate.

Individual awards

Clausura 2017

Group A

Results

Group B

Results

Group C

Results

Final Series

Finals

First leg

Second leg

Audaz won 4-1 on aggregate.

Individual awards

Relegation table 
The three teams that finished last in their respective group would normally be relegated . However, all three teams  will play a series of home and away games and only two will be relegated to the Tercera Division this season. Platense finished top and survived relegation. While Vendaval and Leones de Occidente were relegated.

External links
 https://archive.today/20130807152309/http://www.futbolsv.com/category/segunda-division/
 http://www.culebritamacheteada.com.sv/category/nacional/segunda-division-nacional/ 
 http://www.edhdeportes.com/futbol-nacional/segunda-division/

Segunda División de Fútbol Salvadoreño seasons
2016–17 in Salvadoran football
EL Sal